In differential geometry, a Kähler–Einstein metric on a complex manifold is a Riemannian metric that is both a Kähler metric and an Einstein metric.  A manifold is said to be Kähler–Einstein if it admits a Kähler–Einstein metric.  The most important special case of these are the Calabi–Yau manifolds, which are Kähler and Ricci-flat.

The most important problem for this area is the existence of Kähler–Einstein metrics for compact Kähler manifolds. This problem can be split up into three cases dependent on the sign of the first Chern class of the Kähler manifold:

 When the first Chern class is negative, there is always a Kähler–Einstein metric, as Thierry Aubin and Shing-Tung Yau proved independently.
 When the first Chern class is zero, there is always a Kähler–Einstein metric, as Yau proved in the Calabi conjecture. That leads to the name Calabi–Yau manifolds. He was awarded with the Fields Medal partly because of this work.
 The third case, the positive or Fano case, remained a well-known open problem for many years. In this case, there is a non-trivial obstruction to existence. In 2012, Xiuxiong Chen, Simon Donaldson, and Song Sun proved that in this case existence is equivalent to an  algebro-geometric criterion called K-stability. Their proof appeared in a series of articles in the Journal of the American Mathematical Society. A proof was produced independently by Gang Tian at the same time.

When first Chern class is not definite, or we have intermediate Kodaira dimension, then finding canonical metric remained as an open problem, which is called the algebrization conjecture via analytical minimal model program.

Definition

Einstein manifolds

Suppose  is a Riemannian manifold. In physics the Einstein field equations are a set of partial differential equations on the metric tensor  which describe how the manifold  should curve due to the existence of mass or energy, a quantity encapsulated by the stress–energy tensor .

That is, the Ricci curvature becomes proportional to the metric. A Riemannian manifold  satisfying the above equation is called an Einstein manifold.

Every two-dimensional Riemannian manifold is Einstein. It can be proven using the Bianchi identities that, in any larger dimension, the scalar curvature of any connected Einstein manifold must be constant. For this reason, the Einstein condition is often given as

for a real number

Kähler manifolds

When the Riemannian manifold  is also a complex manifold, that is it comes with an integrable almost-complex structure , it is possible to ask for a compatibility between the metric structure  and the complex structure . Such a triple  is called a Kähler manifold.

Kähler–Einstein metrics

A Kähler–Einstein manifold is one which combines the above properties of being Kähler and admitting an Einstein metric. The combination of these properties implies a simplification of the Einstein equation in terms of the complex structure. Namely, on a Kähler manifold one can define the Ricci form, a real -form, by the expression

The almost-complex structure  forces  to be antisymmetric, and the compatibility condition  combined with the Bianchi identity implies that  is a closed differential form. Associated to the Riemannian metric  is the Kähler form  defined by a similar expression . Therefore the Einstein equations for  can be rewritten as

the Kähler–Einstein equation.

This is a topological necessary condition on the Kähler manifold .

Thus the Kähler–Einstein equation is often written

depending on the sign of the topological constant .

Transformation to a complex Monge–Ampere equation

By the topological assumption on the Kähler manifold, we may always assume that there exists some Kähler metric .

Thus to make  we need to find  such that

This will certainly be true if the same equation is proven after removing the derivatives , and in fact this is an equivalent equation by the -lemma up to changing  by the addition of a constant function. In particular, after removing  and exponentiating, the equation is transformed into 

This partial differential equation is similar to a real Monge–Ampere equation, and is known as a complex Monge–Ampere equation, and subsequently can be studied using tools from convex analysis. Its behaviour is highly sensitive to the sign of the topological constant . The solutions of this equation appear as critical points of the K-energy functional introduced by Toshiki Mabuchi on the space of Kähler potentials in the class .

Existence

The existence problem for Kähler–Einstein metrics can be split up into three distinct cases, dependent on the sign of the topological constant . Since the Kähler form  is always a positive differential form, the sign of  depends on whether the cohomology class  is positive, negative, or zero. In algebraic geometry this is understood in terms of the canonical bundle of :  if and only if the canonical bundle  is an ample line bundle, and  if and only if  is ample. If  is a trivial line bundle, then .
When the Kähler manifold is compact, the problem of existence has been completely solved.

The case c1(X)<0

When the Kähler manifold  satisfies the topological assumption , the canonical bundle is ample and so  must be negative. If the necessary topological assumption is satisfied, that is there exists a Kähler metric  such that , then it was proven by Aubin and Yau that a Kähler–Einstein always exists. The existence of a Kähler metric satisfying the topological assumption is a consequence of Yau's proof of the Calabi conjecture.

Theorem (Aubin, Yau): A compact Kähler manifold with  always admits a Kähler–Einstein metric.

The case c1(X)=0

When the canonical bundle  is trivial, so that , the manifold is said to be Calabi–Yau. These manifolds are of special significance in physics, where they should appear as the string background in superstring theory in 10 dimensions. Mathematically, this corresponds to the case where , that is, when the Riemannian manifold  is Ricci flat.

The existence of a Kähler–Einstein metric was proven in this case by Yau, using a continuity method similar to the case where . The topological assumption assumption  introduces new difficulties into the continuity method. Partly due to his proof of existence, and the related proof of the Calabi conjecture, Yau was awarded the Fields medal.

Theorem (Yau): A compact Kähler manifold with trivial canonical bundle, a Calabi–Yau manifold, always admits a Kähler–Einstein metric, and in particular admits a Ricci-flat metric.

The case c1(X)>0

When the anticanonical bundle  is ample, or equivalently , the manifold is said to be Fano. In contrast to the case , a Kähler–Einstein metric does not always exist in this case. Indeed, much earlier it had been observed by Matsushima and Lichnerowicz that another necessary condition is that the Lie algebra of holomorphic vector fields  must be reductive.

It was conjectured by Yau in 1993, in analogy with the similar problem of existence of Hermite–Einstein metrics on holomorphic vector bundles, that the obstruction to existence of a Kähler–Einstein metric should be equivalent to a certain algebro-geometric stability condition similar to slope stability of vector bundles. In 1997 Tian Gang proposed a possible stability condition, which came to be known as K-stability.

The conjecture of Yau was resolved in 2012 by Chen–Donaldson–Sun using techniques largely different from the classical continuity method of the case , and at the same time by Tian. Chen–Donaldson–Sun have disputed Tian's proof, claiming that it contains mathematical inaccuracies and material which should be attributed to them. Tian has disputed these claims. The 2019 Veblen prize was awarded to Chen–Donaldson–Sun for their proof. Donaldson was awarded the 2015 Breakthrough Prize in Mathematics in part for his contribution to the proof, and the 2021 New Horizons Breakthrough Prize was awarded to Sun in part for his contribution.

Theorem: A compact Fano manifold  admits a Kähler–Einstein metric if and only if the pair  is K-polystable.
A proof based along the lines of the continuity method which resolved the case  was later provided by Datar–Székelyhidi, and several other proofs are now known. See the Yau–Tian–Donaldson conjecture for more details.

Kähler–Ricci flow and the minimal model program

A central program in birational geometry is the minimal model program, which seeks to generate models of algebraic varieties inside every birationality class, which are in some sense minimal, usually in that they minimize certain measures of complexity (such as the arithmetic genus in the case of curves). In higher dimensions, one seeks a minimal model which has nef canonical bundle. One way to construct minimal models is to contract certain curves  inside an algebraic variety  which have negative self-intersection. These curves should be thought of geometrically as subvarieties on which  has a concentration of negative curvature.

In this sense, the minimal model program can be viewed as an analogy of the Ricci flow in differential geometry, where regions where curvature concentrate are expanded or contracted in order to reduce the original Riemannian manifold to one with uniform curvature (precisely, to a new Riemannian manifold which has uniform Ricci curvature, which is to say an Einstein manifold). In the case of 3-manifolds, this was famously used by Grigori Perelman to prove the Poincaré conjecture.

In the setting of Kähler manifolds, the Kähler–Ricci flow was first written down by Cao. Here one fixes a Kähler metric  with Ricci form , and studies the geometric flow for a family of Kähler metrics  parametrised by :

When a projective variety  is of general type, the minimal model  admits a further simplification to a canonical model , with ample canonical bundle.

A precise result along these lines was proven by Cascini and La Nave, and around the same time by Tian–Zhang.
In the case where the variety  is of dimension two, so is a surface of general type, one gets convergence to the 

Later, Jian Song and Tian studied the case where the projective variety  has log-terminal singularities.

Kähler–Ricci flow and existence of Kähler–Einstein metrics

It is possible to give an alternative proof of the Chen–Donaldson–Sun theorem on existence of Kähler–Einstein metrics on a smooth Fano manifold using the Kähler-Ricci flow, and this was carried out in 2018 by Chen–Sun–Wang. Namely, if the Fano manifold is K-polystable, then the Kähler-Ricci flow exists for all time and converges to a Kähler–Einstein metric on the Fano manifold.

Generalizations and alternative notions

Constant scalar curvature Kähler metrics

When the canonical bundle  is not trivial, ample, or anti-ample, it is not possible to ask for a Kähler–Einstein metric, as the class  cannot contain a Kähler metric, and so the necessary topological condition can never be satisfied. This follows from the Kodaira embedding theorem.

A natural generalisation of the Kähler–Einstein equation to the more general setting of an arbitrary compact Kähler manifold is to ask that the Kähler metric has constant scalar curvature (one says the metric is cscK). The scalar curvature is the total trace of the Riemannian curvature tensor, a smooth function on the manifold , and in the Kähler case the condition that the scalar curvature is constant admits a transformation into an equation similar to the complex Monge–Ampere equation of the Kähler–Einstein setting. Many techniques from the Kähler–Einstein case carry on to the cscK setting, albeit with added difficulty, and it is conjectured that a similar algebro-geometric stability condition should imply the existence of solutions to the equation in this more general setting.

When the compact Kähler manifold satisfies the topological assumptions necessary for the Kähler–Einstein condition to make sense, the constant scalar curvature Kähler equation reduces to the Kähler–Einstein equation.

Hermite–Einstein metrics

The resulting equation is called the Hermite–Einstein equation, and is of special importance in gauge theory, where it appears as a special case of the Yang–Mills equations, which come from quantum field theory, in contrast to the regular Einstein equations which come from general relativity.

In the case where the holomorphic vector bundle is again the holomorphic tangent bundle and the Hermitian metric is the 
Kähler metric, the Hermite–Einstein equation reduces to the Kähler–Einstein equation. In general however, the geometry of the Kähler manifold is often fixed and only the bundle metric is allowed to vary, and this causes the Hermite–Einstein equation to be easier to study than the Kähler–Einstein equation in general. In particular, a complete algebro-geometric characterisation of the existence of solutions is given by the Kobayashi–Hitchin correspondence.

References

Notes

Differential geometry